Moonlight Sonata is a 1937 British drama film directed by Lothar Mendes and written by E. M. Delafield and Edward Knoblock. The film stars Ignacy Jan Paderewski, Charles Farrell, Marie Tempest, Barbara Greene and Eric Portman. The film was released on 11 February 1937, by United Artists
and re-released in 1943 as The Charmer (shortened).

Plot
In Sweden, Eric Molander (Charles Farrell) professes his love for Ingrid (Barbara Greene), the beautiful young granddaughter of baroness Lindenborg (Marie Tempest). Meanwhile, in the nearby countryside, a plane with Paderewski and two other passengers on board is forced to land due to mechanical problems. The travellers take refuge at the baroness's country estate; one of them, worldly Mario de la Costa (Eric Portman), steals the naive young Ingrid away from her lover. With Paderewski's help – he plays a hauntingly beautiful rendition of Beethoven's "Moonlight Sonata" which soothingly calms the flighty-minded Ingrid and allows her to come to her senses – Eric exposes Mario as a shameless fortune-hunter who already has a wife, and the young hero and heroine are reunited.  Seen at the beginning of the film as a happily married couple who are attending one of Mr. Paderewski's packed piano recitals, Eric and Ingrid have become the joyful parents of an adorable curly-headed little damsel who herself gets to meet the great artist in person at the concert; at Ingrid's request, he then plays the Moonlight Sonata as his finale.  It is also revealed that Mr. Paderewski's playing of this very same lovely melody two decades earlier had fortuitously brought Ingrid's own parents together, as well.

Cast 
Ignacy Jan Paderewski as Himself
Charles Farrell as Eric Molander
Marie Tempest as Baroness Lindenborg
Barbara Greene as Ingrid Hansen
Eric Portman as Mario de la Costa
W. Graham Brown as Dr. Kurt Broman
Queenie Leonard as Margit
Laurence Hanray as Mr. Bishop
Binkie Stuart as Eric and Ingrid's Child

Critical reception
The New York Times wrote, "LONDON has at last seen "Moonlight Sonata," the film which Paderewski made at Denham last Summer for Lothar Mendez. It is an elegant little picture, set in a beautiful villa among the Swedish firs, and made with a dignity and simplicity worthy of the great figure for whom it was composed. The film begins with a concert at which Paderewski plays the whole of Liszt's Second Hungarian Rhapsody and the first movement of the Moonlight Sonata. Later in the film he plays his own Minuet. The recording of these pieces is excellent and the close-ups of the great pianist and of his hands are fascinating. For the rest he fits simply and unobtrusively into a simple story, speaking with slow precision and acting as naturally as if he were playing his part in real life" ; while Leonard Maltin gave the film two and a half out of four stars, and noted "Well-made but stodgy romance, set in household of Swedish baroness, is excuse for screen appearance by famous concert pianist."

References

External links 
 

1937 films
British black-and-white films
Films directed by Lothar Mendes
United Artists films
1937 romantic drama films
British romantic drama films
Films about pianos and pianists
1930s English-language films
1930s British films